The 1941 Brooklyn Dodgers season was their 12th in the league. The team failed to improve on their previous season's output of 8–3, winning only seven games. They failed to qualify for the playoffs for the 10th consecutive season.

Schedule

Standings

References

Brooklyn Dodgers (NFL) seasons
Brooklyn Dodgers (NFL)
Brooklyn
1940s in Brooklyn
Flatbush, Brooklyn